Harold Solomon (born September 17, 1952) is an American former professional tennis player who played during the 1970s and 1980s. He achieved a career-high world ranking of No. 5 in singles in 1980, and of No. 4 in doubles in 1976. Over the course of his career, he won 22 singles titles.

Solomon was inducted into the Intercollegiate Tennis Association (ITA) Hall of Fame, the USTA Mid Atlantic Section Hall of Fame, the D.C. Sports Hall of Fame, and the International Jewish Sports Hall of Fame.

Early and personal life
Solomon grew up in Silver Spring, Maryland and attended Springbrook High School, lived in Pompano Beach, Florida, and is Jewish. He lives in Fort Lauderdale, Florida, has a wife named Jan, a daughter named Rachel, and a son named Jesse.

Tennis career
He began playing tennis when he was five. He was ranked as high as second in the United States in his junior career, and won the Clay Court Championship when he was 18. He was named an All-American at Rice University, where he was a political science major and a member of Wiess College.

He turned professional when he finished university in 1972, and first won pro matches in 1974. Among his shots was the moonball—a high and deep shot, normally hit with a lot of spin.

At the French Open, Solomon's best showing was when he reached the finals in singles play in 1976. He reached the quarterfinals in 1972 and 1976, and made it to the semifinals in 1974 and 1980. At the US Open, he was a semifinalist in 1977. He won the tournament now known as the Cincinnati Masters twice (in 1977 and 1980) and was a finalist at the 1976 and 1978 United States Pro Championships.

Solomon captured a total of 22 professional singles titles. His lifetime professional win–loss record is 564–315, and he earned over $1.8 million. He was ranked among the top 10 singles players worldwide in 1976, 1978, 1979, and 1980, and was among the top 20 from 1974 to 1980. His best year was in 1980 when his win–loss record was 64–23 and he was ranked No. 5 in the world. He appeared in Playgirl Magazines list of 10 sexiest men that same year.

Solomon played doubles with Eddie Dibbs. In 1976 they were ranked No. 4 worldwide, and were among the top ten in 1974, 1975, and 1976. They were nicknamed "The Bagel Twins."

Solomon is credited with coining the term 'Bagel', referring to a set in tennis that ends with a score of 6–0. It was then popularized by commentator Bud Collins.

Davis Cup
Solomon played in the Davis Cup on the American team in 1972, 1973, 1974, and 1978. He has a record of nine wins and four losses in this competition. The US team won the Davis Cup final in 1972 (3–2 against Romania) and 1978 (4–1 against Great Britain) although Solomon did not play in either final.

ATP
Solomon served as president of the Association of Tennis Professionals from 1980 to 1983 and later on its board of directors.

Halls of Fame
Solomon was inducted into the USTA Mid Atlantic Section Hall of Fame in 1994 and the International Jewish Sports Hall of Fame in 2004. He was named to the Intercollegiate Tennis Association (ITA) Hall of Fame (player) in 2013. He was inducted into the D.C. Sports Hall of Fame in 2016.

Coaching career
Solomon began coaching in the 1990s, working with Jennifer Capriati, Mary Joe Fernandez, Shahar Pe'er, Justin Gimelstob, Eugenie Bouchard, Allie Kiick, Jim Courier, Monica Seles, Anna Kournikova and others. Some of his players won Grand Slam events and the Olympic Games. He founded and runs the Harold Solomon Tennis Center, now known as the Florida Tennis SBT Academy, in Fort Lauderdale, Florida.

Grand Slam finals

Singles: 1 runner-up

Career finals

Singles: 38 (22 wins, 16 losses)

1952 births
Living people
American male tennis players
Jewish American sportspeople
Jewish tennis players
Tennis players from Washington, D.C.
Rice Owls men's tennis players
Sportspeople from Fort Lauderdale, Florida
People from Silver Spring, Maryland
21st-century American Jews